The South Australian Railways Model Brill railcar were two types of railcars operated by the South Australian Railways between 1925 and 1971. Introduced to run on country rail services, the "Barwell Bulls" serviced most of the state's railway lines until they were eventually replaced by both the Bluebird and Redhen railcars, with the last units withdrawn in 1971.

Background

Model 55
In 1924, the South Australian Railways (SAR) decided to order a group of railcars in order to continue services at country stations that did not have enough passengers to make those services financially viable. J. G. Brill Company were contracted to supply twelve railcar chassis, which would be mated to bodies constructed by the SAR's own Islington Railway Workshops. Numbered 4 to 15, these 12 railcars entered service during 1924 and 1925 as the Model 55 railcar class, and overnight these trains were a success.

Model 75
Two years later, the Brill company supplied the SAR with an enlarged version, known as the Model 75. The first was built by J.G. Brill Company with the remaining 38 by the Islington Railway Workshops, entering service in 1927. They differed from the 55s in having a Winton 4-cylinder petrol engine, at 17.8 metres were three metres longer and had a capacity of 63 versus 43. The first 30 (30-59) entered service on the broad gauge, with the other eight (100-106 and 487) built for narrow gauge operation. They were married with 200 and 300 series trailer carriages. One was sold to the Victorian Railways in 1928 after only a few months service.

In service
The 55s and 75s worked on country lines around South Australia until their withdrawal from service, and originally featured a brown livery. To celebrate the 80th anniversary of the SAR in 1936, all Model 55s and 75s still in service were repainted into a green and cream livery, which they wore until retirement. Later, yellow stripes were added to the front to increase visibility. The 55s were built for operation on the broad gauge network, although two (numbers 4 and 10) did operate on the narrow gauge for a time, being renumbered 112 and 111.

All 55s were powered by Midewest four-cylinder  petrol engines, while the 75s used the more powerful Winton Model 110 six-cylinder engines. From 1934, the SAR began re-powering the 55s with Gardner six-cylinder  diesel engines but, as a result of World War II, some railcars were not converted until after 1945. At the same time, multiple-unit controls were fitted to the Brill railcars. In the 1950s, the 75s were re-powered with Cummins diesel engines.

Victorian Railways 44RM & 200MT
In 1928, a Model 75 and trailer were sold to the Victorian Railways, to become their 44RM and 200MT. This was as a trial for comparison against other railmotors then in service, and regularly operated between Echuca and Toolamba.

44RM was damaged in a level crossing collision in 1944. It was formally withdrawn in 1947 and scrapped in 1951.

200MT remained in service until the mid 1970s, then was stored at the back of the Bendigo carriage shed until early 1981. It was then transferred to Newport Workshops for preservation. It is now preserved at Daylesford Spa Country Railway

Withdrawal and preservation

However, the Brills were facing replacement during the 1950s. In 1955 the SAR introduced its Bluebird and Redhen railcars, and the "Barwell Bulls" – nicknamed after a former Premier of South Australia, Henry Barwell, and the bovine sound that the air horn emitted – were moved to suburban services in Adelaide. As more Redhens were constructed to replace them on the metropolitan lines, the last Brill railcars were withdrawn in October 1971.

Five Brills have been preserved. Railcars 8 (55) and 41 (75) are at the National Railway Museum, Port Adelaide, 106 (75) and trailer car 305 are at the Pichi Richi Railway in operational condition. SteamRanger has 60 (75) which was converted from condemned Brill trailer 207 and also 43 (75) which was donated to the society at no cost long-time ARHS member John Wilson.

Trailer 200MT, sold to the Victorian Railways in 1928, was preserved at the Seymour Railway Heritage Centre. It was later transferred to the South Gippsland Railway, and in 2017 it became the responsibility of the Yarra Valley Railway.

The remainder have been scrapped or converted to PWS sleeping cars for use by railways workers. A few ended up as accommodation at the Barossa Junction Motel in the Barossa Valley. This motel has since closed and the carriages sold on to new owners.

References

Further reading

External links

Railcars of South Australia
Transport in Adelaide
Victorian Railways railmotors
J. G. Brill Company